Karl Einar Göran Magnusson (193919 February 2010) was a Swedish politician and member of the Riksdag, the national legislature. A member of the Social Democratic Party, he represented Västmanland County between October 1985 and October 2006. He was also a substitute member of the Riksdag twice: between October 1982 and November 1982 (for Olle Göransson); and between October 1984 and September 1985 (for Lena Hjelm-Wallén). He died on 19 February 2010 aged 70.

References

1939 births
2010 deaths
Members of the Riksdag 1985–1988
Members of the Riksdag 1988–1991
Members of the Riksdag 1991–1994
Members of the Riksdag 1994–1998
Members of the Riksdag 1998–2002
Members of the Riksdag 2002–2006
Members of the Riksdag from the Social Democrats